Lasaeola tristis is a tangle web spider species found from Europe to Central Asia. It is notably found in Lithuania.

See also 
 List of Theridiidae species

References 

Theridiidae
Spiders of Europe
Spiders of Russia
Spiders of Asia
Spiders described in 1833